The 2016 NSL 1 season was the 8th season of play of the National Softball League. NSL 1 operated for the 1st year with pre-determined fixture lists ran during the Diamond Series tournaments.

The top 8 teams during regular season qualified for the 2016 BSF NSL National Championships which was won by Pioneers who beat H2O in the final which was streamed live by WebcastSport.

League business

Teams 
After the 2015 season it was decided that the NSL would be cut to 12 teams from 14. This meant that Maniacs and Warriors the two lowest finishing teams were removed from the NSL for the 2015 season.

Warriors would compete as part of the newly formed NSL 2 in 2015, whereas Maniacs disbanded as a team altogether.

Regular season

Dates 
The NSL 1 competition took place across the first two Diamond Series tournaments and Windsor Tournament.

Standings

References 

Softball in the United Kingdom